Thomas H. Schulman (born October 20, 1951) is an American screenwriter best known for his semi-autobiographical screenplay Dead Poets Society based on his time at the Montgomery Bell Academy (MBA), a college-preparatory day school located in Nashville, Tennessee.

Following high school, Schulman earned a Bachelor of Arts (BA) in philosophy, graduating in 1972 from Vanderbilt University in Nashville. Schulman pursued his interest in film at the University of Southern California's Graduate School of Cinema.

Dead Poets Society won the Best Screenplay Academy Award in 1989, and was nominated for Best Picture and Best Director (Peter Weir). The character of John Keating was inspired by one of Schulman's teachers at MBA.

Prior to Dead Poets Society, Schulman had already written several telemovies. However, Dead Poets Society was his first movie script to reach the screen. He was hired to rewrite the hit movie Honey, I Shrunk the Kids shortly before the film was due to begin shooting; Schulman had just seven days to turn it from a drama into a comedy.

Other scripts written or co-written by Schulman include comedies Welcome to Mooseport, What About Bob?, Second Sight (which Schulman sold the same day as Dead Poets Society) and Holy Man, which stars Eddie Murphy. The Sean Connery drama Medicine Man, originally entitled The Stand, proved a critical failure. Schulman executive produced the movie Indecent Proposal.

Schulman's only film as director to date is 1997 black comedy 8 Heads in a Duffel Bag, which stars Joe Pesci as a gangster attempting to transport a bag of severed heads across the United States.

In 2009, Schulman was elected vice president of the Writers Guild of America, West.

Filmography

References

External links
 Dead Poets Society's Tom Schulman on the Art of Surviving Hollywood, March 15, 2004
 Tom Schulman Biography (1951–)
 

1951 births
Living people
People from Nashville, Tennessee
American male screenwriters
Film producers from Tennessee
Best Original Screenplay Academy Award winners
Film directors from Tennessee
Screenwriters from Tennessee